Charles Terence Clegg "Terry" Wall (born 14 December 1936) is a British mathematician, educated at Marlborough and Trinity College, Cambridge. He is an emeritus professor of the University of Liverpool, where he was first appointed professor in 1965. From 1978 to 1980 he was the president of the London Mathematical Society.

Work 
His early work was in cobordism theory in algebraic topology; this includes his 1959 Cambridge PhD thesis entitled "Algebraic aspects of cobordism", written under the direction of Frank Adams and Christopher Zeeman. His research was then mainly in the area of manifolds, particularly geometric topology and related abstract algebra included in surgery theory, of which he was one of the founders.  In 1964 he introduced the Brauer–Wall group of a field. His 1970 research monograph "Surgery on Compact Manifolds" is a major reference work in geometric topology.

In 1971 he conjectured that every finitely generated group is accessible. The conjecture motivated much progress in the understanding of splittings of groups. In 1985 Martin Dunwoody proved the conjecture for the class of finitely presented groups. The resolution of the full conjecture took until 1991 when, surprising to most mathematicians at the time, Dunwoody found a finitely generated group that is not accessible and hence the conjecture turned out to be not correct in its general formulation.

Wall's work since the mid-1970s has mostly been in singularity theory as developed by R. Thom, J. Milnor and V. Arnold, and especially concerns the classification of isolated singularities of differentiable maps and of algebraic varieties. He has written two research monographs on singularity theory, "The Geometry of Topological Stability" (1995) (containing a great deal of original work) with Andrew du Plessis, and "Singular Points of Plane Curves" (2004).

His notable students include Michael Boardman, Bill Bruce, Andrew Casson, Francis E. A. Johnson, David Mond, Andrew du Plessis, and David Trotman.

Awards 
1965 – Berwick Prize
1966 – Invited address at the 1966 ICM in Moscow
1969 – Elected Fellow of the Royal Society
1970 – Invited address at the 1970 ICM in Nice
1976 – Senior Whitehead Prize
1988 – Pólya Prize
1988 – Sylvester Medal
1990 – Elected a Foreign Member of the Royal Danish Academy of Sciences and Letters
2000 – Elected Honorary Member of the Irish Mathematical Society
2012 – Fellow of the American Mathematical Society

Personal life 
Terry Wall has been married to Sandra Hearnshaw since 1959, and they have four children together. He was the treasurer of the Wirral area SDP from 1985 until its merger with the then Liberal Party in 1988. Wall continued on as treasurer of the newly formed Wirral West Liberal Democrats but, as of May 2020, is no longer holding this position. Wall has been an LEA appointed governor of West Kirby Grammar School since 1987 but has also given up this position. He has also held the post of treasurer at Hoylake Chamber Concert Society. He has 7 grandchildren of which he lives with 3, Alex, Armand and Josie. He also has 2 great grandchildren as of 2020, Rory and Felix.

References

External links

His contact details and list of recent publications
70th birthday conference, Edinburgh, 2006
Surgery theory

1936 births
Living people
Scientists from Bristol
People educated at Marlborough College
Alumni of Trinity College, Cambridge
Topologists
Academics of the University of Liverpool
20th-century British mathematicians
21st-century British mathematicians
Fellows of the Royal Society
Fellows of the American Mathematical Society